Lea & Perrins (L&P) is a United Kingdom-based subsidiary of Kraft Heinz, originating in Worcester, England where it continues to operate. It is best known as the maker of Lea & Perrins brand of Worcestershire sauce, which was first sold in 1837 by John Wheeley Lea and William Henry Perrins who were dispensing chemists from Broad Street, Worcester.

It was inspired by Marcus Sandys, 3rd Baron Sandys who had served in Bengal. He tasted a fish sauce there and asked Lea and Perrins to recreate it but it was putrid until it lay fermenting for three years. It is currently produced in the Midland Road factory in Worcester that Lea and Perrins built. The sauce was first imported to the United States by the Duncan family of New York in 1839 and they continued to be involved for over a hundred years. A subsidiary in Pittsburgh currently manufactures an American version of the recipe.

Worcestershire sauce

Worcestershire Sauce is currently produced at the Midland Road factory in Worcester, built by Lea and Perrins. Midland Road was named after the Midland Railway, the factory originally having rail sidings to provide raw materials and distribution.

Lea & Perrins Worcestershire Sauce UK and US recipes differ slightly in that the UK recipe uses malt vinegar while the US version uses distilled white vinegar. Also, the US version used high fructose corn syrup until 2011 when they reverted to sugar due to health concerns; the UK version has always used sugar. The UK version is sold in Australia, New Zealand and Canada. Lea & Perrins uses a distinctive paper wrapper for the version sold in the United States. In the UK, the bottle is known to consumers for its shape and the orange and black label.

The precise recipe has been a trade secret, but an original 19th-century list of ingredients was found in a skip at the factory in 2009 and includes vinegar, molasses, sugar, salt, anchovies, tamarind extract, onions, and garlic and other ingredients which may include cloves, soy sauce, lemons, pickles and peppers.

Other products

While Kraft only markets a single variety of Worcestershire sauce under different sizes in the UK and in Canada, a few more products are marketed under the L&P brand in the United States. These include a reduced-sodium version of the sauce, a steak sauce, and marinades in peppercorn and vinaigrette flavours.

See also

List of fish sauces

References

External links

 

Food manufacturers of the United Kingdom
Heinz brands
Brand name condiments
Food brands of the United Kingdom
Manufacturing companies based in Worcester, England

History of Worcester, England
Culture in Worcester, England
Condiment companies